Bhadreswar Buragohain (1947 – 26 February 2020) was an Indian politician from Assam belonging to Asom Gana Parishad. He was a member of the Rajya Sabha and Assam Legislative Assembly. He also served as the deputy speaker of the Assam Legislative Assembly too.

Biography
Buragohain was a founding member of the United Liberation Front of Assam. Later, he entered politics.

Buragohain was elected as a member of the Assam Legislative Assembly from Sonari in 1985. He also served as the deputy speaker of the Assam Legislative Assembly from 1 April 1986 to 10 April 1990. Then, he was elected as a member of the Rajya Sabha from Assam in 1990.

Buragohain died on 26 February 2020 at the age of 74.

References

1947 births
2020 deaths
Asom Gana Parishad politicians
Assam MLAs 1985–1991
Deputy Speakers of the Assam Legislative Assembly
Rajya Sabha members from Assam
ULFA members